Gangs of London is an action-adventure open world video game released in 2006 for Sony's PlayStation Portable console. It was developed by London Studio and published by Sony Computer Entertainment. The player has the choice to play as five different gangs in London, with different ethnicities and outfits.

Gameplay
During the course of story mode, the player is given a wide variety of objectives. One objective may require entering a nightclub armed with a jackhammer, while another may involve trying to run the enemy off the road, or them trying to run the player off the road. There are also kidnapping missions, stealth missions, and race missions. Once the story mode is complete, a cliffhanger ending ensues. Outside of missions, the player can free roam the game's environment and complete minigames such as taking photos of London landmarks or running over pedestrians. The game also has "bar" style mini-games, accessed from a pub. The four pub games are darts, skittles, pool, and an arcade game, which is similar to Snake.

Premise
At his country estate, Morris Kane, a veteran cockney gangster and leader of his own firm, breeds pigeons in preparation for an upcoming competition. The next morning, he is horrified to find out that all the pigeons have been slaughtered. Kane soon vows to take over the city.

In Westminster, Russian crime lord Vladislav Zakharov is planning to purchase a Fabergé egg to add to his collection. Returning home, Zakharov finds that his mansion is torched. Enraged by the loss of his paintings and silver, he vows to make London suffer.

Mason Grant, leader of the Jamaican yardie gang EC2 Crew, is out on a date with his girlfriend Chantel. She is later assassinated by an unseen sniper while at a cafe with Grant. He vows revenge in response to her death.

Inside a gambling den, two Water Dragon Triads are intimidated by another who will do whatever it takes to win a game of Mahjong. During the game, a bomb goes off; killing the Triads. Triad leader San Chu Yang declares war on the other gangs.

Indian-British gangster Asif Rashid, who leads the Talwar Brothers, learns that his brother has been set up and arrested by armed police (SCO19). Determined to bail his brother, Rashid assembles his gang to take over London.

The gangs
The player can chose any one out of five playable gangs -
 Morris Kane Firm
 EC2 Crew
 Talwar Brothers
  Zakharov Organisation 
  Water Dragon Triad

Apart from these gangs there are other unplayable gangs which form some parts of the game's storyline -

  Steele Associates : A white-collar criminal group run by a criminal businessman named Andy Steele. The gang plays a major part in the storyline. Its territory is located in central London
 The North London Albanian Gang 
 The Globe Road Gang - a gang made up of prostitutes
 Rahman's Gang - an Indian-origin gang
 The Yakuza gang - it is run by a Japanese gangster named Kanesaka
 The Italian Naples Mafia

Reception

The game received "mixed" reviews according to video game review aggregator Metacritic.

References

External links
 
 
 

2006 video games
Action-adventure games
London Studio games
Open-world video games
Organized crime video games
PlayStation Portable games
PlayStation Portable-only games
Single-player video games
Sony Interactive Entertainment games
Triad (organized crime)
Video games developed in the United Kingdom
Video games set in London